José María Vargas Municipality is one of the 29 municipalities that makes up the western Venezuelan state of Táchira. According to a 2017 population estimate by the National Institute of Statistics of Venezuela, the municipality has a population of 10,126.

References

Municipalities of Táchira